FCI Tallinn II is an Estonian football team based in Tallinn, Estonia.

It is the reserve team of FCI Tallinn.

In 2017, Tallinna FC Levadia and FCI Tallinn joined, which resulted in their reserves also joining and becoming Tallinna FCI Levadia U21.

Statistics

League and Cup

References

External links
 Official website
 Team page at Estonian Football Association

Association football clubs established in 2011
2011 establishments in Estonia
Estonian reserve football teams
Football clubs in Tallinn
FCI Tallinn